Jaana is a 1994 Indian Kannada language romantic drama film written and directed by Shivamani and produced by Sa. Ra. Govindu. The film stars V. Ravichandran along with Kasthuri and Shruti among others.

Cast 
 V. Ravichandran as Ravishankar
 Kasthuri as Kasturi
 Shruti as Lakshmi 
 B. C. Patil as police officer 
 Anandaraj as Anand (Terrorist)
 Anjana as Beena 
 B. V. Radha
Shivaram as shivarama shastri  
 Umashri as Mary 
Bank Janardhan as John 
 Ashalatha
 Kishori Ballal
 Shankar Ashwath
Honnavalli krishna as Auto manju 
Guru murthy 
stunt Devu
Rocket vikram 
Raj kumar

Soundtrack 
The music was composed and lyrics were written by Hamsalekha. All the seven tracks composed for the film became popular with "Prema Lokada Parijathave" and "Premane Nanna Prana" being received well.

References

External links 

 Songs list

1994 films
1990s Kannada-language films
Indian romantic drama films
Films scored by Hamsalekha
1994 romantic drama films